Cyril Muta (born 10 October 1987) is a Papua New Guinean footballer who plays as a defender for Sunshine Coast F.C. in the Queensland State League.

References 

1987 births
Living people
Papua New Guinean footballers
Association football defenders
Morobe Kumuls FC players
Hekari United players
Eastern Stars FC players
Sunshine Coast F.C. players
Papua New Guinean expatriate footballers
Papua New Guinean expatriate sportspeople in Australia
Expatriate soccer players in Australia
Papua New Guinea international footballers